Cable Creek is a stream of approximately  which rises in the U.S. state of Idaho and has its mouth across the state line in Washington.

Geography
Cable Creek flows roughly north to south from Cable Peak on the Mica Peak ridge at approximately 4,600 feet above sea level and enters the Spokane River at approximately 2,020 feet above sea level. The stream drops roughly 2,500 feet over the span of five miles. Most of that elevation change occurs in the first two miles, where the creek navigates down Mica Peak, the southernmost of the Selkirk Mountains. The lower reaches of Cable Creek enter the Spokane Valley, with relatively flat terrain compared to the upper reaches. The stream flows under Interstate 90 just before meeting the Spokane River, immediately east of the city of Liberty Lake in the former community of Spokane Bridge.

From its source in Idaho the stream crosses the state line three times, first into Washington, then back into Idaho, and ultimately into Washington once again. The upper portion is heavily forested and mountainous while the lower portion flows through farmland.

References

Geography of Spokane, Washington
Rivers of Idaho
Rivers of Washington (state)
Rivers of Kootenai County, Idaho
Rivers of Spokane County, Washington